David Cohen is a cellist from Belgium who made his solo debut with the Belgium National Orchestra when he was 9.

Cohen was born in Tournai, Belgium and studied at the Yehudi Menuhin School and then at the Guildhall School of Music & Drama where he studied under Oleg Kogan. He has won more than 25 prizes in International Cello Competitions including Gold Medal of the G.S.M.D. in London, the Geneva International Cello Competition, J.S.Bach International Competition, and many others. 

In March of 2001, he was appointed as the Principal Cello of the Philharmonic Orchestra of Belgium, becoming the youngest Principal Cello in history. During the 2002-2003 music season, he was nominated as the ECHO "Rising Star" by the Royal Philharmonic Society of Belgium and the Concertgebouw.

He is the Artistic Director of the Melchoir Ensemble and the founder and Artistic Director of the chamber music festival, “Les Sons Intensifs” in Lessines, in Belgium. He is also a professor at the Conservatoire Royal de Musique de Mons in Belgium, a position he has held since 2000, and at the Trinity Laban in London, England.

In December 2021 he was appointed Principal Cello of the London Symphony Orchestra.

References

External links
official website

Belgian cellists
Year of birth missing (living people)
Living people